Lasi, or Lassi, is an Indo-Aryan language of Pakistan belonging to the Sindhi group and commonly counted as a dialect of Sindhi itself. It is spoken by the Lasi people of Lasbela District in Balochistan.

Dispute
Lasi has been disputed whether it is a language or a dialect of Sindhi.  Most linguists agree that it is part of the wider Sindhi languages, not to be confused with the Sindhi language itself, which includes many languages that used to be dialects of Sindhi, such as Jadgali and Kutchi.

Loanwords 
Lasi is known to be using loanwords from other languages, primarily Persian as well as Balochi.  More recently, many English and Urdu words have entered the language.

Orthography 
Lasi uses the same orthography as Sindhi except an extra letter, ۏ, which has been added to the Balochi Standard Alphabet.  Many educated Lasi speakers use the Latin alphabet in an effort to romanise the language.

References

Languages of Balochistan, Pakistan
Languages of Pakistan
Northwestern Indo-Aryan languages
Sindhi language